The discography of Modern Baseball, an American rock band formed in 2011, consists in three studio albums four extended plays, six singles and six music videos.

Studio albums

Compilation albums

Extended plays

Singles

Videography

References

Pop punk group discographies
Discographies of American artists